After the mid-16th century, many Rajput rulers formed close ties with the Mughal emperors and served them in various capacities. It was because of the support of the Rajputs that Akbar was able to lay the foundation of the Mughal Empire in India. The Rajput nobles had their daughters married to the Mughal emperors and their princes for political purposes. For example, Akbar performed 40 marriages for himself and for his sons and grandsons, of which 17 were Rajput-Mughal alliances. The successors of the Mughal emperor Akbar, the mothers of his son Jahangir and grandson Shah Jahan were Rajputs. The Sisodia Rajput family of Mewar made it an honor not to enter into matrimonial relations with the Mughals, and thus stood in contrast to all other Rajput clans. After this time, the marital relations between the Rajputs and the Mughals declined somewhat. Akbar's relations with the Rajputs began when he returned in 1561 from a visit by the Chisti Sufi Shaikh of Sikri, west of Agra. Then many Rajput princesses married Akbar.

List of Rajput-Mughal matrimonial relations
In February 1562, Akbar married Mariam-uz-Zamani,  daughter of Raja Bharmal (Kachwaha-Amber). 
In 1562, Akbar married the granddaughter of Rao Viramde. (Rathore-Merta) 
On 15 November 1570, Rai Kalyan Singh married his niece, Raj Kunwari, to Akbar (Rathore-Bikaner) 
In 1570, Akbar married Bhanumati, another niece of Rai Kalyan Singh (Rathore-Bikaner) 
In 1570, Puram Bai, a great-granddaughter of ￼Rao Viramde was married to Akbar. (Rathore-Merta) 
In 1570, Maharawal Harraj Singh married his daughter Princess Nathi Bai to Akbar (Bhati-Jaisalmer).
In 1573, the marriage of Akbar to the daughter of Raja Jaichand of Nagarkot (Nagarkot)
On March 1577, the marriage of Akbar to the daughter of the Rawal Askaran took place(Gehlot-Dungarpur)
In 1581, Keshavdas married his daughter to Akbar (Rathore-Morta)
Akbar also married Rukmavati, daughter of Rao Maldeo. (Rathore-Marwar) 
On 16 February 1585, Prince Salim (Jahangir) was married to Princess Man Bai, the daughter of Bhagwant Das (Kachwaha-Amber)
On 11 January 1586, the marriage of Prince Salim (Jahangir) to Princess Manavati Bai, the daughter of Mota Raja Udai Singh took place (Rathore-Marwar)
On 26 June 1586, Prince Salim was married to daughter of Raja Rai Singh. (Rathore-Bikaner) 
In 1587, Prince Salim married, Malika Jahan, daughter of Maharawal Bhim Singh. (Bhati-Jaisalmer) 
Prince Salim married Karamsi, daughter of Kesho Das. (Rathore-Bikaner)  
On 12 October 1595, the marriage of Daniyal to Raimal's daughter took place. (Rathore-Marwar)
On 17 June 1608, Jahangir married the daughter of Jagat Singh. (Kachwaha-Amber)
On January 1610, Jahangir married the daughter of Ram Chandra Bundela (Bundela-Orchha)
On April 1624, the marriage of Prince Parvez to Princess Manbhavati Bai, the sister of Maharaja Gaj Singh (Rathore-Marwar) 
Prince Khurram (Shah Jahan) married Lilavati Bai, daughter of Sakat Singh (Rathore-Marwar) 
In 1654, the marriage of the daughter of Rao Amar Singh to Prince Suleiman Shikoh (Rathore-Marwar) 
In 1671, marriage of Mohammad Muazzam (Bahadur Shah I) to Princess Amrita Bai, the daughter of Maharaja Roop Singh Rathore of Kishangarh took place (Rathore-Kishangarh)
On 5 July 1678, Azim-ush-Shan was married to Bai Jas Kaur, Kirat Singh's daughter, the son of Raja Jai Singh (Kachwaha-Amber)
30 July 1681, Aurangzeb's son Kaam Baksh was married to Amarchand's daughter (Shekhawat-Manoharpur).￼ 
Jahandar Shah was married to a Rajput Princess, Anup Bai. 
On 27 September 1715, Farrukhsiyar married the daughter of Maharaja Ajit Singh, Princess Indira Kanwar (Rathore-Marwar) 
1800s, Shah Alam II's daughter Sultani  Begum married to Nawab Sammo Rajput of Ranipur Vilayat. Upon marriage Sultani Begum's name became "Nawabi" (Samma-Ranipur)

References

Rajputs
Rajput history